The 1958 San Francisco Giants season was the franchise's first season in San Francisco, California and 76th season overall.  The Giants' home ballpark was Seals Stadium.  The team had a record of 80–74 finishing in third place in the National League standings, twelve games behind the NL Champion Milwaukee Braves.

Of the broadcast team, Russ Hodges left his former broadcasting partners in New York and for that season was joined on both KTVU and KSFO by Lon Simmons.

Offseason 
 December 2, 1957: Tony Taylor was drafted from the Giants by the Chicago Cubs in the 1957 rule 5 draft.
 December 2, 1957: 1957 minor league draft
Lee Tate was drafted from the Giants by the St. Louis Cardinals.
Ramón Conde was drafted from the Giants by the Kansas City Athletics.
 December 10, 1957: Freddy Rodríguez was traded by the Giants to the Chicago Cubs for Tom Poholsky.
 March 24, 1958: Foster Castleman was purchased from the Giants by the Baltimore Orioles for $30,000.
 Prior to 1958 season: 
Dick LeMay was signed as an amateur free agent by the Giants.
 Eddie Fisher was signed by the San Francisco Giants as an amateur free agent.

Regular season

Opening day 
The Giants and the now-Los Angeles Dodgers, arch-rivals for 68 years in New York, faced each other in their respective first-ever game on the West Coast. On Tuesday afternoon, April 15, 1958, at Seals Stadium, the Giants' temporary home park, San Francisco blanked Los Angeles, 8–0, behind Rubén Gómez' complete game, six-hit shutout. Gómez fanned six, issued no bases on balls, and went two for four at the plate. Daryl Spencer hit the first home run in San Francisco's MLB history with a solo shot in the fourth inning, and rookie Orlando Cepeda followed with another solo blast one inning later. Willie Mays had two runs batted in. Don Drysdale took the loss for the Dodgers. Attendance at the longtime minor league stadium was a sellout, 23,448.

Starting lineup

Season standings

Record vs. opponents

Notable transactions 
 April 2, 1958: Ray Katt was traded by the Giants to the St. Louis Cardinals for Jim King.
 April 3, 1958: Bobby Thomson was traded by the Giants to the Chicago Cubs for Bob Speake and cash.
 May 17, 1958: Nick Testa was released by the Giants.
 June 3, 1958: Gaylord Perry was signed as an amateur free agent by the Giants.
 July 15, 1958: Jim King was acquired from the Giants by the Toronto Maple Leafs.
 August 25, 1958: Jesús Alou was signed as an amateur free agent by the Giants.

Roster

Player stats

Batting

Starters by position 
Note: Pos = Position; G = Games played; AB = At bats; H = Hits; Avg. = Batting average; HR = Home runs; RBI = Runs batted in

Other batters 
Note: G = Games played; AB = At bats; H = Hits; Avg. = Batting average; HR = Home runs; RBI = Runs batted in

Pitching

Starting pitchers 
Note: G = Games pitched; IP = Innings pitched; W = Wins; L = Losses; ERA = Earned run average; SO = Strikeouts

Other pitchers 
Note: G = Games pitched; IP = Innings pitched; W = Wins; L = Losses; ERA = Earned run average; SO = Strikeouts

Relief pitchers 
Note: G = Games pitched; W = Wins; L = Losses; SV = Saves; ERA = Earned run average; SO = Strikeouts

Awards and honors 
 Orlando Cepeda – National League Rookie of the Year

All-Star Game

Farm system 

LEAGUE CHAMPIONS: Phoenix, Corpus Christi, Fresno

Notes

References 
 1958 San Francisco Giants team page at Baseball Reference
 1958 San Francisco Giants team page at Baseball Almanac

San Francisco Giants seasons
San Francisco Giants season
1958 in sports in California